The Marvin Duchow Music Library is a branch of McGill University Library. Its mandate is to "provides resources and services to support the performance, composition, research, and teaching programs of the Schulich School of Music".

Description 
Located in Montreal, at the third, fourth and fifth floors of the  Elizabeth Wirth Music Building, the library contains printed scores, recordings, books and journals, and other data related to music and its performance. More than 200 000 documents are accessible to visitors, making the collection one of the most important in Canada, documenting  Renaissance scores, Baroque music, jazz recordings and 20th-century music. The library also offers audio and video equipment to its members, including microphones, playback equipments, turntables...

Pianos are available to visitors and members in the library.

Archival collection 
The library also contains a small archival collection, which contains correspondence, photographs, programmes  and audio and video recordings documenting Canadian music, both classical and avant-garde, through artists such as Kelsey Jones and Bernard Gagnon, which taught or were students of McGill University.

Contents of the collection

References 

Academic libraries in Canada
Music libraries
McGill University